Society for the Prevention of Cruelty to Animals (SPCA) is a common name for non-profit animal welfare organizations around the world. 

SPCA may also refer to:
 Secretory Pathway Ca²⁺ ATPase, a protein also known as SPCA
 Factor VII, sometimes called serum prothrombin conversion accelerator
 Société provençale de constructions aéronautiques, a French aircraft manufacturer that merged into SNCASE